Killimster  is a small remote scattered hamlet in Wick, in eastern Caithness, Scottish Highlands and is in the Scottish council area of Highland. RAF Skitten, the departure point for Operation Freshman, was located at Killimster.

References

Populated places in Caithness